Gangothri is a 1997 Indian Malayalam-language film, directed by P. Anil and produced by S. Satheesh. The film stars Suresh Gopi, Roja Selvamani, Sangeetha,  Thilakan, Ratheesh and Rajan P. Dev. The film has musical score by S. P. Venkatesh. It marked the Malayalam debut of Roja. The film was dubbed into Telugu as Political War.

Plot
Adv. Sarathchandran fights against corruption, and criminal activities of politicians Krishnadas and Tripadi for dismantling their power.

Cast
Suresh Gopi as Adv. Sarathchandran
Roja as Nandana Menon
Sangeetha as Gopika  Iyer
Thilakan as Justice Ramaiyer
Ratheesh as S. Krishnadas
Devan as DCP Alexander IPS
N. F. Varghese as Adv. Nambiar
Sathyapriya
Rajan P. Dev as Devarayar
Kitty as Bhuvaneswar Tripadi
Prathapachandran
Hemanth Ravan as Mirza Kasim
Kollam Thulasi as Adv. Krishnan Kartha
Krishnakumar as Salim, Sarath's assistant
Murali as Mukundan Menon
Chali Pala as Maheedran
Nandhu

Soundtrack
The music of the film was composed by S. P. Venkatesh and the lyrics were written by Gireesh Puthenchery.

References

External links
 

1997 films
1990s Malayalam-language films
Indian action thriller films
1997 action thriller films